The 2007 United States motorcycle Grand Prix was the eleventh round of the 2007 MotoGP championship. It took place on the weekend of 20–22 July 2007 at the Laguna Seca circuit.

MotoGP classification
Chaz Davies replaced Alex Hofmann after the first practice session due to injury.

Championship standings after the race (MotoGP)

Below are the standings for the top five riders and constructors after round eleven has concluded. 

Riders' Championship standings

Constructors' Championship standings

 Note: Only the top five positions are included for both sets of standings.

References

United States motorcycle Grand Prix
United States
United States Motorcycle Grand Prix
United States Motorcycle Grand Prix